The Dayton-Wright Company was formed in 1917, on the declaration of war between the United States and Germany, by a group of Ohio investors that included Charles F. Kettering and Edward A. Deeds of Dayton Engineering Laboratories Company (DELCO). Orville Wright lent his name and served as a consultant, but other than that, the location of one of its three factories in the original Wright Company factory buildings in Dayton, Ohio was the only connection to the Wright brothers. In addition to plant 3 (the former Wright Company buildings), Dayton-Wright operated factories in Moraine (plant 1, the main factory) and Miamisburg (plant 2), Ohio.  During the course of the war, Dayton-Wright produced about 3,000 DH-4s, as well as 400 Standard SJ-1 trainers. The company was hurt by the reputation of the DH-4s it produced as "flaming coffins" or "flying coffins", although they were not in reality more subject to catching fire than other aircraft, and by scandals it faced.

History

Deeds and Kettering had previously worked together in several ventures. Deeds' DELCO produced automobile self-starters developed by Kettering. The two used DELCO's profits to form the Dayton Metal Products Company. Then they formed the Dayton Airplane Company in 1917, which was reorganized as the Dayton-Wright Company in April. When the war began, Deeds was commissioned and put in charge of procurement for the Aircraft Production Board. He divested himself of his financial interest in Dayton-Wright but awarded the company two contracts to produce more than 4,000 DH-4 and Standard SJ-1 aircraft. Given the company's inexperience, the size of its contract led to charges of favoritism. A United States Senate committee corroborated these allegations, and U.S. President Woodrow Wilson appointed a commission headed by future Supreme Court of the United States Chief Justice Charles Evans Hughes to investigate. Although mismanagement and favoritism were documented, charges were not brought, and the company survived the scandal. It went on to produce the XPS-1, the first airplane held by the U.S. Army with retractable landing gear.

In 1919, Dayton-Wright built a limousine version of the DH-4, the single-seat Messenger, and a three-seater. In 1920, Milton C. Baumann designed the RB-1 racer, with solid balsa wood wing, enclosed cockpit, and retractable landing gear linked to rod-operated leading and trailing-edge camber-changing flaps.

In 1923 the Dayton-Wright Company had just started producing side-by-side TW-3 aircraft, powered with World War I surplus Wright E engines (American-built 180 hp Hispano-Suiza) when it was closed down by the parent company General Motors, which had purchased it in 1919. Its design rights, chief designer (Colonel Virginius E. Clark), and the TW-3 contract, were acquired by the newly formed Consolidated Aircraft Corporation of Buffalo, New York in 1923. Subsequent TW-3 aircraft were delivered as Consolidated TW-3s.

Products

Aircraft

Missiles
 Kettering Bug

References

External links

 Dayton-Wright Company photo collection at Wright State University
 Congressional Investigation of War Expenditures – Involves the Dayton-Wright Company

Defunct aircraft manufacturers of the United States
Manufacturing companies based in Ohio
Defunct companies based in Dayton, Ohio
American companies established in 1917
Manufacturing companies established in 1917
Manufacturing companies disestablished in 1929
1917 establishments in Ohio
1929 disestablishments in Ohio
Former General Motors subsidiaries